Sir John A. Macdonald Secondary was a secondary school in Hamilton, Ontario, before it closed in 2019. At the time of closing, it was the largest high school in the Hamilton-Wentworth District School Board (HWDSB). The school opened in 1970 and had an enrollment of 1250 students in 2009. At its peak, the student body represented over 80 countries of origin and the students had over 50 different native languages. The building has an auditorium that seats 750 people. The building is located at 130 York Boulevard, Hamilton, Ontario, close to the city Public Library and across the street from the Copps Coliseum and Lloyd D. Jackson Square Mall.

As of 2019, the City of Hamilton and the HWDSB is planning to demolish the former school and build a community centre.

History
Sir John A. Macdonald Secondary School was opened in 1970 to replace Hamilton's Central Secondary School.  The school is named after former Canadian Prime Minister, John A. Macdonald.  It became a semestered school in 1976.

Former programs
 Special Art Program: The Special Art Program at Sir John A. Macdonald was the oldest magnet program in the city with its origins dating back to the Hamilton Art School in the late 1800s. The program was meant to help students gain entry to post secondary art programs at colleges and universities.
 WOW-World of Work: The World of Work program was focused on the skills and knowledge required for a career in the retail industry.
 Restaurant Hospitality Pathway:  The Restaurant Hospitality pathway program focused on the skills and knowledge required for a career in the restaurant industry.
 Web Design and Computer Game Design Technologies:  This program was to teach skills and knowledge required for a career in web design or computer game design.
 Applied Design - Portfolio Program:  This courses was meant to offer students the opportunity to upgrade studio skills or expand their existing portfolio after graduating from their home school.
 Team Games Sport-Specific Program:  This program allowed students to focus on sport specific skills necessary for either volleyball, or basketball or soccer.
 Native Studies and Arts Program:  The Native Studies and Arts program offered aboriginal and non-aboriginal students an opportunity to study native culture, issues and arts.
 After School Literacy Program: Established to help prepare students for the OSSLT with special emphasis placed on ESL students and students new to the standardized testing format.
 Memorial Bursary Program: Financial assistance program established to assist students who demonstrated good attendance and commitment to academics.
 Credit Recovery Programs: System and Alter Ed credit recovery programs for junior and senior students who had experienced academic failure in the past.
 ESL Reading Buddies: Designed to assist ESL students with their reading skills.
 ESL Student Welcoming Committee: A program that introduced SJAM extracurricular activities to ESL grade 9 students by senior student mentors with teacher support.
 Homework Club: After-school program that provided academic assistance for all grades with special emphasis on grade 9 and ESL students.
 Nutrition Program: Attempted to ensure all students had access to proper nutrition by providing breakfast and lunch for students who required assistance.
 NYA:WEH: Aboriginal Stay In School initiative
 Traditional Drum & Dance Program: An after-school program that introduces students to the traditional art of aboriginal drumming and dance.
 PLACES: In-school Alternative Education and Credit Recovery Program
 SHAE: Aboriginal Alternative Education School at the Hamilton Regional Indian Centre
 SISO: On-site counsellors which provided services to populations of newcomers with language needs.
 Walk in Closet: Program that attempted allowed students access to clothing, personal hygiene products and school supplies.

Former clubs
 Art Club & Arts Festival
 Breakfast Club
 Business Education Awards
 Canadian Blood Services
 Cheerleaders
 Chess Club
 Choir
 Communications Club
 C.P.R. Training
 DECA
 Drug and Alcohol Education
 Environmental/Hiking Club/Recycling
 First Aid Committee
 Grad Committee
 Grad Gown Committee
 History Club
 Home Page Club
 Knitter's Club
 Mac Shack
 Macdonald Athletic Council
 Math Awards Luncheon
 Math Contests
 Needy Student Fund
 New York Art Trip
 Ontario Youth Apprenticeship Program
 Ontario Students Against Impaired Driving
 Photography Club
 Radio Station
 Stage Crew
 United Way
 Visa Club
 Walk In Closet
 Yearbook Club
 Badminton
 Baseball
 Basketball
 Cross Country
 Fitness Club
 Football
 Slo Pitch
 Soccer
 Table Tennis
 Tennis
 Volleyball
Wrestling

See also
List of high schools in Ontario

External links

Sir John A. Macdonald Secondary School
Sir John A. Macdonald School profile

High schools in Hamilton, Ontario
High schools in Ontario
Educational institutions established in 1970
Educational institutions disestablished in 2019
1970 establishments in Ontario
2019 disestablishments in Ontario